Chance Cove Provincial Park is a provincial park located approximately 20 km south of Renews-Cappahayden, Newfoundland and Labrador. Chance Cove was once the site of a small settlement of approximately 50 people in the mid-19th century, and is home to many shipwrecks of the Atlantic Ocean. Until the late 1980s, pieces of the forgotten homes were still visible.

See also
List of protected areas of Newfoundland and Labrador
List of Canadian protected areas

External links
Newfoundland Provincial Parks website

Provincial parks of Newfoundland and Labrador